The Las Vegas Thunderbirds are a junior ice hockey team in the United States Premier Hockey League (USPHL). The Thunderbirds play their home games at City National Arena.

History 
The Las Vegas Thunderbirds were announced by the Western States Hockey League (WSHL) as an expansion team on February 14, 2019. They began play in the 2019–20 season.

Team ownership includes Corey St. Germain, while its president is former NHL player John Marks. A first-round selection (ninth overall) in the 1968 NHL Entry Draft by the Chicago Blackhawks, Marks has coached at the junior level as well as professional hockey. He retired from coaching in 2015 after four seasons leading the Fargo Force of the United States Hockey League.

In 2020, the Thunderbirds left the WSHL after one season and joined another independent junior hockey league, the United States Premier Hockey League (USPHL), at the Premier (Tier III) level.

Season-by-season records

References

External links
 Las Vegas Thunderbirds website

Sports teams in Las Vegas
Ice hockey teams in Nevada
Ice hockey clubs established in 2019
2019 establishments in Nevada